James Franklin Oliver Sr. (February 10, 1919 – December 5, 1971) was an American Negro league shortstop in the 1940s.

Oliver was the father of fellow major leaguer Nate Oliver. He played for the Cleveland Buckeyes in 1946, and also played for multiple barnstorming teams, and went on to play minor league baseball for the St. Petersburg Saints of the Florida State League in the 1950s. Oliver died in St. Petersburg, Florida in 1971 at age 52. Following his death, the baseball field at St. Petersburg's Campbell Park was named in his memory.

References

External links
 and Seamheads

1919 births
1971 deaths
Place of birth missing
Cleveland Buckeyes players
Baseball shortstops
St. Petersburg Saints players
20th-century African-American sportspeople